FESPA is a federation of trade associations and an organiser of exhibitions and conferences for the screenprinting and digital printing industry.  The name originally stood for Federation of European Screen Printers Associations, but, with the advent of digital technology, FESPA is now known by its acronym.

Overview
FESPA is a "federation of global screen, textile and digital printing trade associations" servicing its members and the print community at large. FESPA are also an events and exhibitions organiser for the wide format, screen, textile and digital printing community.

The organisation provides a forum for information exchange between member associations resulting in help from the larger to the smaller Associations in recruitment, training and technical studies.

It also runs a number of events and community outreach programmes, including industry research and educational programmes for students, vehicle wrapping competitions, Awards, networking events  and design conferences.

Heritage
FESPA was formed as a 'non-profit' organisation in 1962 by a group of screen printing associations whose aim was to create a platform to share knowledge on screen printing technology in Europe.

The original membership consisted of 8 representatives, including Michel Caza - fine art printer to artists including Andy Warhol and Salvador Dalí. As the organisation grew, more associations joined.  Current membership stands at around 40 national associations.

The current president is Christophe Aussenac.

Research
FESPA produces market research on the trends, challenges, opportunities and threats confronting the community in partnership with InfoTrends – a research organisation for the print trade.

The reports provide analysis of the state of the marketplace and are funded through the organisation's 'Profit for Purpose' initiative.

References

External links
 
Official Website
About Fespa Web
Direct To Film Printing

Digital imaging
Exhibitions
Screen printing
Printing